Lower Shing Mun is one of the 41 constituencies of the Sha Tin District Council. The seat elects one member of the council every four years. Since its creation in 1994, the seat has continuously been held by the Civil Force until 2019, and is now held by Community Sha Tin's Ken Wong Ho-fung.

Councillors represented

Election results

2010s

References

2011 District Council Election Results (Sha Tin)
2007 District Council Election Results (Sha Tin)
2003 District Council Election Results (Sha Tin)
1999 District Council Election Results (Sha Tin)
 

Constituencies of Hong Kong
Constituencies of Sha Tin District Council
1994 establishments in Hong Kong
Constituencies established in 1994
2007 establishments in Hong Kong
Constituencies established in 2007
2003 disestablishments in Hong Kong
Constituencies disestablished in 2003